Sleeping with the Past is the 22nd studio album by English musician Elton John, released on 29 August 1989. It is his best-selling album in Denmark (where it was recorded) and is dedicated to his longtime writing partner Bernie Taupin. The album features "Sacrifice" and "Healing Hands", which were issued as a double A-side and became John's first solo number-one single in his home country of the UK. The single's success helped the album also hit number one there, his first since 1974's Elton John's Greatest Hits. It also became his first platinum album in the UK since 1985's Ice on Fire. In the US it was certified gold in October 1989 and platinum in April 1990 by the RIAA. Sleeping with the Past became John's best selling album of the 1980s.

John and Taupin meant for the songs to reflect the style of 1960s R&B icons such as Marvin Gaye, Otis Redding and Sam Cooke, whom they admired.

Guy Babylon made his debut on this album and would continue to play keyboards with John for the next 20 years, while Fred Mandel left the band shortly after. John went into rehabilitation in 1990.

Background
With renewed creativity after 1988's Reg Strikes Back, Elton John and Bernie Taupin sought to create a cohesive album that had maintained a consistent theme. Inspired by the success of Billy Joel's 1983 album An Innocent Man, they decided to pay a similar tribute to the R&B sound of the 1960s and '70s that inspired them as youths. Taupin would listen to '60s soul songs and use those songs from the past to inspire new lyrics for their album. He would then write down which artists or songs influenced him. John would then use Taupin's guide to write a soul song that sometimes ventured away from the original source of inspiration. Many of the songs have a somewhat clear influence while others contain a mixture of various soul influences.

Sleeping with the Past is the second of John's albums where he plays a Roland RD-1000 digital piano in place of his regular acoustic grand piano. The instrument is directly credited on the album's sleeve notes, and John used it on promotional appearances associated with the album and the subsequent tour. Davey Johnstone is the only member of John's "classic" band who appears on the album—Dee Murray and Nigel Olsson being notable absences.  Keyboardist Guy Babylon makes his first appearance on an Elton John album, and also joined his touring band at the same time.

Months after the album's completion, John attributed its creative success to the certainty that some unpleasant chapters in his life, such as his battle with The Sun, were drawing to a close. In 1989 he said: "This is the first album I've made where I didn't have any pressures hanging over me...When I started it, I knew my personal life was going to be sorted out". Some years later he said: "I was sober when I recorded Sleeping with the Past - just". but that changed soon after: "I went off the rails when I did the tour afterwards". During the tour's first week, he collapsed onstage.

The album was released late in John's 1989 American tour with little support from MCA records. John canceled tour shows and interviews. In New Haven, Connecticut, on October 18, 1989, he rushed through his performance rarely talking to the  audience. Midway through his concert, he announced he would not perform material from the new album because MCA was not promoting it.

In addition to "Sacrifice", "Healing Hands" and "Club at the End of the Street", which were singles in both the UK and US, the songs "Whispers" and "Blue Avenue" were released as singles in parts of Continental Europe. "Whispers" reached No. 11 in France, whilst "Blue Avenue" managed to reach the Top 75 in the Netherlands. "Blue Avenue" describes his failed marriage to Renate Blauel.

The outtake "Love Is a Cannibal" was featured in the 1989 film Ghostbusters II.

Wynonna Judd recorded a contemporary country music cover version of "Stone's Throw from Hurtin" which was featured in the 1992 film Leap of Faith starring Steve Martin.

Reception
Sleeping with the Past received lukewarm reviews when the album was released in 1989. After peaking at No. 6 in October 1989 on the UK Albums Chart, the re-release of "Sacrifice" as a double A-side with "Healing Hands" in June 1990, and that single's rise to the #1 spot, Sleeping with the Past was propelled back up to the #1 position on the UK Albums Chart shortly afterwards.

The album became his highest-selling studio album in the UK, being certified 3× Platinum and spawned his first solo No. 1 hit in his home country.

Track listing

 Sides one and two were combined as tracks 1–10 on CD reissues.

Notes
 The version of "Durban Deep" on the 1998 remaster features a different vocal mix and is slightly extended from the original album version (the fade out lasts about ten seconds longer).

Personnel 
Track numbering refers to CD and digital releases of the album.
 Elton John – Roland RD-1000 digital piano, lead and harmony vocals, backing vocals (1)
 Guy Babylon – keyboards
 Fred Mandel – keyboards (1, 2, 3, 5, 7, 9, 10), organ (4), guitars (1, 4, 8), guitar solo (6)
 Peter Iversen – Fairlight and Audiofile programming
 Davey Johnstone – guitars, backing vocals (1, 2, 4, 5, 6, 8, 9, 10)
 Romeo Williams – bass
 Jonathan Moffett – drums
 Vince Denham – saxophone (4)
 Natalie Jackson – backing vocals (2, 5, 6, 8, 9)
 Mortonette Jenkins – backing vocals (2, 5, 6, 8, 9)
 Marlena Jeter – backing vocals (2, 5, 6, 8, 9)

Production 
 Produced by Chris Thomas
 Engineered by David Nicholas
 Engineering assistance by Karl Lever
 Mixed at Air Studios (London, England) and Puk Studios.
 Mastered by Greg Fulginiti at Artisan Sound Recorders (Hollywood, California).
 Album coordination – Steve Brown
 Studio coordination – Adrian Collee and Dee Whelan
 Technicians – Tom Pearce (keyboards), Rick Salazar (guitars) and Terry Wade (drums).
 Design by Wherefore Art?
 Photography by Herb Ritts

Charts

Weekly charts

Year-end charts

Certifications and sales

References

External links

1989 albums
Elton John albums
Albums produced by Chris Thomas (record producer)
The Rocket Record Company albums